Seemless is Into Another's third full-length album, released on September 12, 1995 on Hollywood Records.

Background and recording
The band recorded the album at Seattle's London Bridge Studios in Seattle, WA, with producer Rick Parashar who Richie Birkenhead described as "the most down to earth, unpretentious, coolest guy in the world." The band spent three weeks recording the album. In an interview, Birkenhead said, "There are a few layers, like on some songs we have an acoustic guitars, or on "Regarding Earthlings" there is a tamboura way back in the mix. Also on the song "May I", I play a Wurlitzer."

Release and reception
The opening track on the album, "Mutate Me," was released as a music video, directed by Fred Stuhr. The second single, "T.A.I.L." was also released as a video, directed by Noah Bogen. The track fared well on radio, climbing to #39 on the Billboard Single chart in 1996.

Ultimately the album failed to make an impact on the charts, with the band blaming the label for "terrible distribution and promotion." The album is currently unavailable in the iTunes Music Store, which Birkenhead blames on Hollywood Records, saying the label "deliberately shelved and deleted stuff from catalogs."

Track listing

Personnel

Into Another
 Richie Birkenhead - vocals, Worlitzer organ
 Peter Moses – guitars
 Tony Bono – bass
 Drew Thomas – drums, congas

Additional Musicians
 Victor Axelrod - Hammond B3 organ

Production and recording 
 Rick Parashar - Engineer, Mixing, Producer
 John Plum - Engineer
 Ray Martin - Engineer
 Greg Griffith - Assistant Engineer
 George Marino - Mastering
 Geoff Ott - Assistant Engineer

References

External links
"Mutate Me" Music Video
"T.A.I.L." Music Video

1995 albums
Into Another (band) albums